Neutraubling is a town in the state of Bavaria in southern Germany, in the district of Regensburg.

The town has only existed since 1951. After the second world war, displaced ethnic Germans from Sudetenland (Czech Lands) or former eastern territories of Germany (Poland) settled in the ruins of the bombed military airport. Today, it is a more or less important industrial site.

During the Second World War, Neutraubling was used as an airbase and factory for the Messerschmitt aircraft manufacturing company.

Between the end of 1940 and April 23, 1945, the factory was able to house up to 2,750 slave laborers at a time.

Between 20 February 1945 and 26 April 1945, inmates of Flossenbürg concentration camp were held there until forced into a 'death march' to Dachau concentration camp.

Even today, it is possible to find relics of the early history of Neutraubling and its airbase past. For example, what is known as the "Schlangenbau", which is now home to people from various nations all over the world, was the command centre of the airbase. The small pond located next to the Schlangenbau was used as a water reservoir for the airbase fire brigade.

Even the Catholic church there still harbours various signs of the past. It is said that parts of the wall of the church were taken from a destroyed hangar. The main road leading through the city itself has its roots in one of the World War II airstrips.

Despite Neutraubling's earliest roots dating back to the stone age period, it can't compete with Regensburg's rich history.
Neutraubling also provides a fully fledged education infrastructure starting with three kindergartens up to a grammar school. Furthermore, Neutraubling is also home to various medium-sized and internationally operating enterprises, e.g. Krones, which has its very roots in this city. Nightlife in Neutraubling is what can be expected from a city of only 13,000 inhabitants.

Number of inhabitants

Mayors since 1951
 Hans Herget (SPD) 1951-1965
 Herbert Scholz, (1923-2007), (Free Voters) 1965-1988
 Eleonore Mayer (SPD) 1988-June 2006
 Heinz Kiechle (CSU) July 2006-April 2020
 Harald Stadler (Free Voters) May 2020-present

Local council
The local council has 24 members.

CSU: 10 seats
SPD: 4 seats
Active citizens: 5 seats
Free voters: 5 seats
(Elections of the year 2014)

References

Regensburg (district)